Izoninskaya is a rural locality (a village) in Pokrovskoye Rural Settlement, Velikoustyugsky District, Vologda Oblast, Russia. The population was 17 as of 2002.

Geography 
Izoninskaya is located 26 km southeast of Veliky Ustyug (the district's administrative centre) by road. Rodionovitsa is the nearest rural locality.

References 

Rural localities in Velikoustyugsky District